Mueang Nong Bua Lam Phu is the capital district (amphoe mueang) of Nong Bua Lam Phu province, northeastern Thailand.

Geography
Neighboring districts are (from the south clockwise): Non Sang, Si Bun Rueang, and Na Klang of Nong Bua Lam Phu Province; Kut Chap and Nong Wua So of Udon Thani province.

Administration
The district is divided into 15 sub-districts (tambons), which are further subdivided into 179 villages (mubans). The town (thesaban mueang) Nong Bua Lam Phu covers parts of tambons Nong Bua, Pho Chai, and Lam Phu. There are three townships (thesaban tambon): Hua Na, Na Mafueang, and Na Kham Hai. Each covers parts of the same-named tambon. There are a further 13 tambon administrative organizations (TAO).

Mueang Nong Bua Lam Phu